Marcel Peyrouton (2 July 1887 – 6 November 1983) was a French diplomat and politician. He served as the French Minister of the Interior from 1940 to 1941, during Vichy France. He served as the French Ambassador to Argentina from 1936 to 1940, and from 1941 to 1942. He served as the Governor-General of French Algeria in 1943. He was acquitted in 1948.

Early life
Marcel Peyrouton was born in 1887. He received a Doctorate in Law from the University of Paris. His thesis was entitled Étude sur les monopoles en Indochine. In 1910 he entered the central administration of the Colonies as a trainee. In 1914, Mr. Peyrouton was administrator of the Colonies. He joined the army as a sergeant in an infantry regiment. He was wounded on August 24 in the battle of Préjanville [possibly during the Battle of the Trouée de Charmes]. He went into the air force and continued his services as a pilot-aviator in the squadrons of the front, in the Vosges, then in Syria. He was demobilized with the rank of lieutenant-pilot-aviator. During his service he was awarded the Croix de Guerre with two citations.

Career

After the war Mr. Peyrouton was assigned to Madagascar as deputy director of the civil cabinet of the Governor General of this Colony, then was delegate of the Commissioner of the Republic in Cameroon. He was appointed Chief Administrator of the Colonies in 1923. In 1925, he was director of the Economic Agency of the African territories under mandate, then, in 1928, fulfilled the functions of the deputy chief of the cabinet of the Minister of the Colonies. He was Appointed Governor of the Colonies in 1929 and served as lieutenant-governor of the Middle Congo. In 1929 he was named an officer of the Legion of Honor. The award is seen in the picture from the 1930s accompanying this article

Peyrouton next served as the Secretary General of French Algeria from 1931 to 1933, and as the Resident-General of Tunisia from 1933 to 1936. He served as the French Ambassador to Argentina from 1936 to 1940.

Peyrouton served as the French Minister of the Interior from 1940 to 1941, during Vichy France. He served as the French Ambassador to Argentina once again from 1941 to 1942.

Peyrouton was appointed as the Governor-General of French Algeria in January 1943. While American Jewish organizations objected to his appointment due to his recent Vichy past, US Ambassador Robert Daniel Murphy suggested Peyrouton was not antisemitic. Peyrouton resigned in June. In letters to Generals de Gaulle and Giraud he requested that he be allowed to serve as a captain in the infantry, the rank he held in the army reserve. His offer was accepted but he was arrested preventively on December 22, 1943 on orders from the Committee of National Liberation.

Peyrouton gave evidence at Pétain's trial chiefly on the arrest of Laval. He was acquitted by the High Court on December 22, 1948. The court found that he had made serious mistakes but these were mitigated by his subsequent efforts to resist the Germans. The Legion of Honor Leonore database of recipients contains no information on Mr. Peyrouton suggesting that his award was revoked presumably in response to his collaboration with Germany.

Personal life and death
Peyrouton married Paulette Malvy, the daughter of politician Louis Malvy. He  died on 6 November 1983, aged 96.

Works
 Peyrouton, Marcel (1913). Étude sur les Monopoles en Indochine (Paris: E. Larose).

References

External links
 

1887 births
1983 deaths
University of Paris alumni
People of Vichy France
French interior ministers
Ambassadors of France to Argentina
French non-fiction writers
20th-century non-fiction writers
Governors general of Algeria